Thatto Heath railway station is located in the Thatto Heath area of St Helens, Merseyside, England. The station, and all trains serving it, are operated by Northern Trains, however the station is branded Merseytravel using Merseytravel ticketing. The station opened with the line in 1871.

Facilities
The station has a small wooden ticket office on the northbound platform, which is staffed from beginning to end of service each day (including Sundays).  There are also waiting shelters on both platforms, along with customer help points, digital information screens and timetable posters.  Step-free access is available on each side, via ramps from the road above.

Services
Some afternoon peak and late evening trains continue to Preston and Blackpool North. The service frequency also drops to hourly in the evenings.

Gallery

References

External links

Railway stations in St Helens, Merseyside
DfT Category E stations
Former London and North Western Railway stations
Railway stations in Great Britain opened in 1871
Northern franchise railway stations